The Ministry of Labour and Social Security is a government ministry office of the Republic of Turkey, responsible for labour and social security affairs in Turkey. The ministry is headed by Vedat Bilgin.

History 
Initially, the ministry was formed as the Office of Labour and Labourers within the Ministry of Economy upon Act of Parliament No. 2450, which came into force on 27 May 1934. As a governmental ministry, it was established on June 22, 1945 with the Act of Parliament No. 4763.

In 1983, the Ministry of Labour and the Ministry of Social Security were merged into the Ministry of Labour and Social Security.
In 2018, the ministry was merged with the Ministry of Family and Social Policy. This merger was undone in 2021, making the Labour and Social Security related tasks headed by a separate minister again.

See also
 Cabinet of Turkey
 Ministries of Labour
 Ministries of Social Security

References

External links
Official website 

Labour and Social Security
Turkey
Labor in Turkey